Sanqoz may refer to:
 Sanqoz-e Bala
 Sanqoz-e Pain
 Sanqoz-e Vosta